Garching is a municipality in the district of Altötting in Bavaria in Germany.

References

Altötting (district)